Jieznas is a small city in the Prienai district municipality, Lithuania.

History

Jieznas was first mentioned in written sources in 1492 as property of the Grand Duke of Lithuania. In 1633, the settlement was acquired by the Pac family. They sponsored construction of a church, which was reconstructed in Baroque style in 1768–1772.

In 1747, the Pac family built a luxurious palace in Jieznas. The palace had 12 halls, 52 rooms, and 365 windows to match the number of months, weeks, and days in a year. It was decorated with frescoes, gilded engravings, Venetian mirrors. The palace was lost due to family indebtedness in 1807 and was destroyed by a fire in 1837.

In early February 1919, the Lithuanian victory in the battle of Jieznas, one of the first battles of the Lithuanian–Soviet War, prevented the Red Army from marching into Kaunas. This battle is commemorated by the coat or arms, designed by Arvydas Každailis in 2002. The coat of arms depicts allegorical figure of a woman symbolizing the victory. She holds a golden oak branch, a symbol of strength.

On September 2, 1941, 144 Jews from Jieznas were shot near the lake in Strazdiškės village by Rollkommando Hamann, policemen and members of the Riflemen's Union from Jieznas.

Name
Jieznas is the Lithuanian name of the city. Transcribed versions of the Lithuanian name in other languages include Polish: Jezno, Russian: Езно Yezno, Belarusian: Езна Yezna, Yiddish: יעזנע Yiezne.

References

Cities in Lithuania
Cities in Kaunas County
Troksky Uyezd
Holocaust locations in Lithuania